The Group Settlement Scheme was an assisted migration scheme which operated in Western Australia from the early 1920s.  It was engineered by Premier James Mitchell and followed on from the Soldier Settlement Scheme immediately after World War I.  Targeting civilians and others who were otherwise ineligible for the Soldiers' scheme, its principal purpose was to provide a labour force to open up the large tracts of potential agricultural land to ultimately reduce dependence on food imports from interstate.  It was also seen by Australians as boosting the ideals of the White Australia policy by strengthening the Anglo-Australian cultural identity of Australia.  High levels of post-war unemployment in Britain saw the UK Government seizing on the scheme as a way to reduce dole-queues.  Over 6,000 people emigrated to Western Australia under the scheme which was funded jointly by the State, Federal and UK Governments.

Mitchell's plan was for  land holdings to be cleared and intensively cultivated by the settlers, initially supervised by experienced farmers, to develop a self-sustaining dairy industry.  Premier Mitchell was nicknamed "Moo-Cow" from his perceived obsession with the dairy industry.  He and his Nationalist and Country Party colleagues considered the 'unlimited land resources for closer settlement' were the key to the state's economic progress.

History

Individual family settlements 
Under an agreement made with the British government, the state would take up to 6,000 men from the UK and settle them on 6,000 farms over a five-year period.

Migrant settlers received financial assistance for their and their families' passage to Australia, and in return were required to work in small communities in undeveloped areas in the State's South West and Wheatbelt regions.  After often only one or two days of acclimatisation and processing on arrival, properties were allocated by ballot and the settlers transported to their selections.  After a period of establishment, the settlers were required to repay a 30-year loan (not exceeding £1,000) provided by the Agricultural Bank, and at the completion of the loan repayment the settler would have freehold title to the property.  They were paid 10 shillings per day during the land clearing phase and offered a £10 loan for the purchase of household and agricultural equipment.  The loan was interest-only for the first five years.  The communities (or groups) typically comprised between twelve and twenty families. They cleared land, built fences and established their farms in areas which had previously been unable to attract settlers.

The promises made to applicants were often unrealistic and sometimes grossly misleading, and caused many to resign and walk off the properties soon after arrival and realisation of the task before them.  For those that did persevere, communities endured considerable hardships and deprivation.  Inadequate resources were provided, and the settlers often lacked the necessary farming skills and suitability for rural enterprise.  Unsuitable equipment was often supplied for clearing the immense hardwood timber forests.  Uneconomic farm sizes and depressed agricultural prices forced consolidations and various changes to the scheme.  In some areas, poor land quality also led to failures.  The extreme isolation in the virgin forests and lack of infrastructure such as roads and communications made life difficult.  By April 1924, 30% of migrants and 42% of Australians had abandoned their allocations.  Others stayed as they had no alternative.  Sustenance payments were made to support many families.

Group settlements 
The term "Group Settlement" was believed to have come from a suggestion made by a British soldier-settler John Wozencroft who had been assigned a  allotment near Lefroy Brook at Pemberton.  After selecting his property from a plan in Perth with advice from the Lands Department, Wozencroft travelled to Pemberton only to discover it to be impossibly isolated and that the heavily timbered property could only be cleared with the assistance of a small team of men.  He wrote a letter directly to Premier Mitchell saying that he and his government "should be had up for misrepresentation".  Mitchell reacted quickly, possibly fearing a public relations issue, and despatched Barbe More, a Lands Inspector at Bunbury.  More interviewed Wozencroft in November 1920 who relayed his suggestion that future allotments be made to four of five settlers in a group, and that an expert adviser be initially assigned to each group to assist and advise.

The first group settlement was at Manjimup in 1921 and comprised eighteen blocks. Other settlements were established in Northcliffe, Denmark, Nornalup, Walpole, and Bridgetown.  A programme of draining the vast floodplains above the Peel-Harvey Estuary was instigated during the same period.  This freed up potential farmland in the Peel Estate which was subdivided and allocated to many of the groups.  The sandy soils were found to be of poor quality however, and mostly unsuited for cattle grazing or pastures. The urbanised Perth suburbs of Baldivis and Bertram were part of this area. Samuel Bateman's estate in the Byford area was also similarly subdivided.

In 1924-25 the government established a Royal Commission on Group Settlement.  The commission's final report was published on 9 June 1925 and included:
The new method of land settlement was put into effect in March 1921, when Group 1 was started on its way to Manjimup.  This group in common with the first 40 inaugurated between this date and December 1922 was made up mainly of colonials or migrants of some years standing, but from then onwards the groups became composed almost entirely of migrants.

At that time there were 127 groups in operation throughout the South-West.  Establishment of new groups was abandoned briefly but later resumed with more settlements at Northcliffe, Busselton and Manjimup.

Mitchell's successor Philip Collier supported and continued the scheme through most of his Premiership from 1924 to 1930.  With the 1930s Depression and the collapse of dairy produce prices, ever more settlers walked off their properties.  Politicians called for its scrapping due to the drain of the state's resources with the high failure rate.  The last settlement established was at Northcliffe in May 1928.  In 1930, government support was finally withdrawn and management responsibility for the remaining settlements passed to the Agricultural Bank.

Legacy

The policy helped establish a dairy industry which flourishes today, and many successful farms were cleared by the group workers. It also saw the expansion and establishment of a number of townships, schools and rail links. Over 40,000 hectares (100,000 acres) of land was cleared by the scheme which had cost the state £3 million.

After World War II, many of the abandoned Group Settlement farms were taken over by immigrants under a new Soldier Settlement Scheme, the next assisted migration scheme.

British newspaper magnate Alfred Harmsworth, 1st Viscount Northcliffe, actively promoted the scheme in its early years through his UK newspapers, especially The Times. The town of Northcliffe was established through the scheme and named to recognise his role.

John Tonkin worked as a teacher at a two-teacher school at the group settlement of Nuralingup (near Augusta) for several years from 1923. He later taught at another group settlement at Margaret River. Tonkin became Labor state premier from 1971 to 1974. He is the only former teacher to have reached the office of premier of the state.

The program was succeeded by a Group Migration Scheme operated out of London by the Western Australian Government. Co-ordinated by Digby Blight from 1959 to 1962.

List of Group Settlements

See also

Immigration to Australia
Baldivis Tramway
Peel Main Drain

Notes

References

Further reading

External links
Group Settlement Scheme
Group Settlement